Wells Branch is a census-designated place (CDP) in Travis County, Texas, United States. The population was 14,000 at the 2020 census.

History
Wayman F. and Mary Emily Wells settled in the Wells Branch area sometime around 1827. Wells is recorded by the Austin History Center to have been a spy and a scout for the Texians during battles in Goliad and San Antonio, when the Republic of Texas declared their independence from Mexico.

Geography
Wells Branch is located at  (30.443997, -97.678469), 13 miles (21 km) north of downtown Austin.

According to the United States Census Bureau, the CDP has a total area of 2.5 square miles (6.6 km2), of which, 2.5 square miles (6.6 km2) of it is land and 0.39% is water.

Demographics

As of the 2020 United States census, there were 14,000 people, 6,270 households, and 2,852 families residing in the CDP.

As of the census of 2010, there were officially 12,120 people, 5,490 households, and 2,580 families residing in the CDP. This number is considered low as the governing body, the Wells Branch Municipal Utility District, estimates the population in 2010 to be approximately 18,000 residents including the numerous multi-family residents on the southern side of the district. The population density was 4,456.3 people per square mile (1,720.1/km2). There were 5,625 housing units at an average density of 2,224.0/sq mi (858.4/km2). The racial makeup of the CDP was 71.30% White, 9.65% African American, 0.40% Native American, 9.59% Asian, 0.17% Pacific Islander, 5.93% from other races, and 2.96% from two or more races. Hispanic or Latino of any race were 16.68% of the population.

There were 5,490 households, out of which 24.8% had children under the age of 18 living with them, 35.8% were married couples living together, 8.4% had a female householder with no husband present, and 53.0% were non-families. 40.9% of all households were made up of individuals, and 1.0% had someone living alone who was 65 years of age or older. The average household size was 2.05 and the average family size was 2.87.

In the CDP, the population was spread out, with 20.0% under the age of 18, 14.4% from 18 to 24, 49.3% from 25 to 44, 14.2% from 45 to 64, and 2.2% who were 65 years of age or older. The median age was 30 years. For every 100 females, there were 101.1 males. For every 100 females age 18 and over, there were 100.8 males.

The median income for a household in the CDP was $46,934, and the median income for a family was $60,530. Males had a median income of $43,645 versus $32,063 for females. The per capita income for the CDP was $27,664. About 4.1% of families and 4.5% of the population were below the poverty line, including 5.2% of those under age 18 and none of those age 65 or over.

Governance

Wells Branch is a Municipal Utility District that supplies water/wastewater service to residents as well as manages parks and other recreational facilities and programs.  The District is recognized for its substantial commitment to water conservation including a significant rain water harvesting program designed into District Facilities and an irrigation well completed in September 2014.

Originally governed by a Board appointed by the original developer, in 1987 residents, led by still resident Mike Howe, won a majority of the five seats on the Board. Residents have governed the District since that time allowing Wells Branch to grow into one of the most popular residential communities in the Austin area. A number of residents have been elected to the Board over the years including Ms. Donna Howe, who was elected after Mr. Howe voluntarily stepped down when he joined another governmental body in the area.  Ms. Howe, who had been the leader of the Wells Branch Neighborhood Association for many years, served on the Wells Branch MUD Board for 18 - years including serving as president, opting not to run for re-election in November 2014.

Over the years, the Board expanded the park system with a Park Master Plan, added a second competition pool, a Community Center, a Recreation Center, and redeveloped a former stock pond into a small lake in the middle of the park system.  Taxes and water rates remain affordable, and with the amenities, Wells Branch is considered one of the most liveable communities in the U.S.

The Board has also undertaken multiple projects in recent years, including adding a skate park, remodeling the recreation center, and remodeling the Willow Bend Pool.

The Wells Branch Municipal Utility District provides all services to residents except Police and courts, which are provided through the Travis County Sheriff's Department and Travis County, and Fire and Fire Based EMS services, which are provided by Travis County Emergency Services District #2.

Education
Three schools and Independent School Districts, Pflugerville (North West Elementary) and Round Rock (Wells Branch Arts Integration Academy and Joe Lee Johnson Elementary), serve the community of Wells Branch.

Library

The Wells Branch Library district was formed in 1998 after a state law was passed to allow the establishment of library districts in areas not currently served by library systems. As a result, the library is funded by a sales tax revenue of 1/2% from Wells Branch businesses. An elected board of five manages, of which Faye Cormier is the president, the funds and operations of the Wells Branch Community library.

The formation of the initial Library Board and construction of the Library was accomplished by local residents led by Ms. Dianne Koehler, who served as the first President of the Wells Branch Community Library. The library has over 42,000 items available for checkout, rooms for community use, and over 20 computers for patron use.

Mills Pond
Mills Pond is a reservoir for Wells Branch creek. Wells Branch creek begins in Wells Branch and is a Tributary of Walnut Creek which travels south through the city of Austin, Texas and eventually empties into the Colorado River.

References

External links
 Wells Branch Community Library
 Wells Branch MUD

Census-designated places in Travis County, Texas
Census-designated places in Texas
Census-designated places in Greater Austin